The Dutch House may refer to:

 The Dutch House (Brookline, Massachusetts), a building in Brookline, Massachusetts
 The Dutch House, Bristol, a demolished building in Bristol, England
 The Dutch House, York, a building in York, England
 The Dutch House (novel), a 2019 novel by Ann Patchett

Other uses
 Dutch house, a style of the electro house music genre that originated in the Netherlands
 Dutch House (New Castle, Delaware), a late-17th-century house in New Castle, Delaware
 Dutch Houses, Chester, a building in Chester, England